The 2019 Boyd Gaming 300 was a NASCAR Xfinity Series race held on March 2, 2019, at Las Vegas Motor Speedway in Las Vegas. Contested over 213 laps due to an overtime finish on the  asphalt intermediate speedway, it was the third race of the 2019 NASCAR Xfinity Series season.

Entry list

Practice

First practice

Final practice

Qualifying
Qualifying was canceled due to rain. Cole Custer was awarded the pole for the second consecutive race due to 2018 owner's points. Again, Chad Finchum qualified 2nd.

Qualifying results

Race

Stage results

Stage One
Laps: 45

Stage Two
Laps: 45

Final Stage results

Stage Three
Laps: 123

References

Boyd Gaming 300
Boyd Gaming 300
NASCAR races at Las Vegas Motor Speedway
2019 NASCAR Xfinity Series